Cornus glabrata is a species of dogwood native to California and Oregon and known by the common names brown dogwood, smooth dogwood, and western cornel. This is a large shrub or thicket-forming bush with bright green leaves which turn red in fall. It bears plentiful clusters of fuzzy white flowers and bluish-white berries. This shrub is most often found near water, usually directly on the bank of a water source.

References

Cappiello, P. and D. Shadow. (2005). Dogwoods: The Genus Cornus. Portland: Timber Press. page 59

External links
Jepson Manual Treatment
USDA Plants Profile
Interactive Distribution Map of Cornus glabrata

glabrata
Flora of California
Flora of Oregon
Flora without expected TNC conservation status